Pinc Louds is a music group based in New York City. The lead singer Claudi (pronounced "cloudy") is the main songwriter and public face of the band. Claudi, who uses pronouns “he” and “she,” describes the music as loud, punk, soft, and pink; just like herself.

Pinc Louds has been known throughout New York City for performing in many nightclubs, but also for shows in public places such as subway stations and parks.

Claudi is from Puerto Rico and performed there before moving to New York.

The band became more popular during the COVID pandemic as they performed outdoors in public places, so people who were not otherwise going to concerts found them as they were staying away from indoor spaces.

Hailed as “the band that saved summer [2020]” by ABC News and Gothamist, Pinc Louds has continued to play for large audiences in NYC parks, street corners, venues such as Elsewhere and le Poisson Rouge, as well as tours in the USA and Europe with the likes of NOFX, Me First and the Gimme Gimmes, and more. 

Current members of the band are Claudi (vocals, guitar, kalimba),  Marc “the Monster” Mosteirin (bass, keyboard) and Shadow (drums).
Former members include upright bassist Ofer Bear, drummer Raimundo Atal and synth player Sebastián Castrodad.

The band has also collaborated with puppeteers Jamie McGann, Madison Berg, Jamie Emerson and Kevin Perez.

References

External links

Indie pop groups from New York (state)
Musical groups from New York City